Justice Rees may refer to:

Grover Rees III, chief justice of the High Court of American Samoa
Warren J. Rees, associate justice of the Iowa Supreme Court

See also
Justice Reese (disambiguation)